Augusta Aasen, née Paasche (19 May 1878 – 3 August 1920) was a Norwegian politician for the Labour Party.

She was born in Osen as a daughter of Fredrik Christian Paasche and Pauline Sivertsdatter Vaagen. Together with book printer Edolf Aasen (1877–1969) she had the son Arne Paasche Aasen, a well-known poet.

She hailed from Steinkjer, and was a member of Trondhjem city council from 1908 to 1911. She was the first female council member in Norway's third largest city. She then moved to Kristiania and was a secretary in Norges Socialdemokratiske Ungdomsforbund from 1912 to 1914. She also worked in the newspaper Direkte Aktion.

Politically, she was a board member of Kristiania Labour Party, and a deputy board member of the central board. In 1920, she was the only female Norwegian delegate to the Second Comintern Congress. Here she died at the airport when she was hit by an airplane propeller. She was buried in the Kremlin Wall Necropolis (Mass Grave No. 9) as the only Norwegian woman buried here.

References

1878 births
1920 deaths
People from Osen
People from Steinkjer
Politicians from Trondheim
Politicians from Oslo
Labour Party (Norway) politicians
Norwegian socialist feminists
Victims of aviation accidents or incidents in Russia
20th-century Norwegian politicians
20th-century Norwegian women politicians
Accidental deaths in the Soviet Union
Burials at the Kremlin Wall Necropolis